Łagów is the name of several villages in Poland:
Łagów, Lower Silesian Voivodeship (south-west Poland)
Łagów, Łódź Voivodeship (central Poland)
Łagów, Świętokrzyskie Voivodeship (south-central Poland)
Łagów, Masovian Voivodeship (east-central Poland)
Łagów, Krosno Odrzańskie County in Lubusz Voivodeship (west Poland)
 Łagów, Kielce County
 Łagów, Krosno County
 Łagów, Łowicz County
 Łagów, Łódź County
 Łagów, Świebodzin County
 Łagów, Zwoleń County

See also
 Łagów Landscape Park